Yerba Buena Cove was a cove on San Francisco Bay where the Mexican pueblo of Yerba Buena was located. It lay between Clarks Point to the north (southeast of Telegraph Hill, near the corner of Broadway and Battery Streets) and Rincon Point to the south (near the corner of Harrison and Spear Streets). The beach of the cove was set back as far as what is now Montgomery Street between Clay and Washington Streets. 

Between the beginning of the California Gold Rush and 1860, the cove was filled in, and the downtown of the city of San Francisco built over it. A number of ships were sunk in the cove, including some that were intentionally scuttled to allow the owners to claim the land around the sunken ship. Wrecks known to remain buried include the Apollo, the Niantic, and the Rome, the latter of which was discovered in 1994 during construction of the Muni Metro Turnback Tunnel.

References

External links
  Map of San Francisco, Showing Business Section and Waterfront, 1851-52 from ronhenggeler.com, accessed March 31, 2015. 
 Yerba Buena Cove, from foundsf.org accessed March 31, 2015 
  1846 watercolor of Yerba Buena and Yerba Buena Cover
  Maps of Yerba Buena and Yerba Buena Cove
  Yerba Buena Survey Area

San Francisco Bay
Landforms of the San Francisco Bay Area
Landforms of San Francisco